The Sports Junior was an English automobile manufactured between 1920 and 1921.  A 10 hp two-seater with a four-cylinder Peters engine, it had detachable disc wheels.

See also
 List of car manufacturers of the United Kingdom

References
 David Burgess Wise, The New Illustrated Encyclopedia of Automobiles.

Defunct motor vehicle manufacturers of the United Kingdom